Kristers is a Latvian masculine given name. People bearing the name Kristers include:

Kristers Aparjods (born 1998), luger
Kristers Freibergs (born 1992), ice hockey defenceman
Kristers Gudļevskis (born 1992), ice hockey goaltender
Kristers Serģis (born 1974), sidecarcross rider
Kristers Tobers (born 2000), footballer
Kristers Zoriks (born 1998), basketball player

References

Latvian masculine given names
Masculine given names